Peter Jakubička (born 8 September 1985) is a Slovak football defender who currently plays for FC Mönchhof.

External links
FC Spartak Trnava profile (archived 18 April 2013)

References

1985 births
Living people
Slovak footballers
Association football defenders
FC Spartak Trnava players
FK Slovan Duslo Šaľa players
Expatriate footballers in Austria
Slovak Super Liga players
Sportspeople from Trnava